Christopher Barner-Kowollik FAA, FQA, FRSC, FRACI (born 1973) is an Australian Research Council (ARC) Laureate Fellow, the Senior Deputy Vice-Chancellor and Vice-President (Research) of the Queensland University of Technology (QUT) and Distinguished Professor within the School of Chemistry and Physics at the Queensland University of Technology (QUT) in Brisbane. He is the Editor-in-Chief of the Royal Society of Chemistry (RSC) journal Polymer Chemistry, a principal investigator within the Soft Matter Materials Laboratory at QUT and associate research group leader at the Karlsruhe Institute of Technology (KIT).

Education and career 
After his undergraduate studies of chemistry at the Universities of Constance and Goettingen (Germany), Christopher Barner-Kowollik earned his PhD in physical chemistry (Dr. rer. nat.) from the University of Goettingen in 1999. Following postdoctoral research with Prof. Tom Davis at the University of New South Wales in Sydney, he held academic positions at the Centre for Advanced Macromolecular Design (CAMD), and was appointed Full Professor of Polymer Chemistry in 2006 at the same institution. In 2008 he moved back to Germany, where he became the Chair of Macromolecular Chemistry at the Karlsruhe Institute of Technology (KIT). There he was the founding director of the Collaborative Research Centre SFB 1176 'Molecular Structuring of Soft Matter' established by the German Research Council (DFG). He is a founding PI and thrust speaker in the DFG Excellence Cluster 3D Matter Made to Order. While he relocated in 2017 to the Queensland University of Technology (QUT), where he was awarded an Australian Laureate Fellowship and appointed Director of QUT's Soft Matter Materials Laboratory, Christopher Barner-Kowollik continues to be an associate group leader at the KIT's Institute of Nanotechnology and the Institute of Polymer Chemistry and Chemical Technology, after heading a full research group at the KIT until 2020. In December 2019, Christopher Barner-Kowollik was appointed Deputy Vice-Chancellor Research and Vice-President of the Queensland University of Technology (QUT) and in September 2022 Senior Deputy Vice Chancellor and Vice-President (Research) at the same institution.

Research 
Initially Prof. Barner-Kowollik’s research was in the field of polymer chemistry and polymer reaction kinetics. His research has expanded towards the fusion of polymer chemistry with organic and photochemistry. Current research areas include the development of advanced wavelength-orthogonal, -synergistic, and -antagonistic reactions, and their photophysical understanding, most notably opening the field of wavelength-resolved action spectra for photochemical covalent bond formation and cleavage demonstrating that molecular absorptivity and photochemical reactivity are oftentimes disparate, translated to the photochemical synthesis of highly defined macromolecular architectures. The developed photochemical platform finds application for the design of 2D and 3D photolithographic processes as well as in biosystems including single cell scaffolds. Christopher Barner-Kowollik has published over 730 peer-reviewed research papers, which have been cited close to 43,000 times.

Selected awards and recognitions 
2023 CNRS Ambassador of Chemical Sciences in France
2022 HG Smith Medal of the Royal Australian Chemical Institute (RACI)
 2022 Distinguished Professor (QUT)
 2022 David Craig Medal of the Australian Academy of Science
 2022 European Polymer Federation Prize
 2020 United Kingdom Macro Group Medal
2019 QUT Vice-Chancellor's Award for Leadership Excellence
2019 Prime Ministers Prize for Science Finalist
2019 Elected Fellow of the Australian Academy of Science
2017 Australian Laureate Fellowship, Australian Research Council (ARC)
 2016 Erwin Schrödinger Award of the Helmholtz Association, jointly with M.  Wegener and M. Bastmeyer
 2012 Erskine Fellowship (University of Canterbury), Christchurch, New Zealand, Distinguished Fellow
 2012 International Biannual Belgian Polymer Award
 2008 Citation of the Royal Australian Chemical Institute (Polymer Division)
 2007 UNSW Faculty of Engineering Research Excellence Award
 2007 COSMOS Bright Sparks Award
 2007 Australian Professorial Fellowship, Australian Research Council (ARC)
 2006 Finalist of the Australian Museum Eureka UNSW Prize for Scientific Research
 2006 Finalist of the Australian Museum Eureka Prize People's Choice Award
 2005 Edgeworth David Medal of the Royal Society of New South Wales
 2004 Rennie Memorial Medal of the Royal Australian Chemical Institute
 2002 UNSW John Yu Fellowship to the Royal Technical Institute in Stockholm, Sweden

Elected Fellowships 

Fellow of the Queensland Academy of Arts and Sciences (FQA)
Fellow of the Australian Academy of Science (FAA)
Fellow of the Royal Society of Chemistry (FRSC)
Fellow of the Royal Australian Chemical Institute (FRACI)

References

External links 
 Curriculum vitae
 Faculty website

1973 births
Living people
Australian materials scientists
Fellows of the Australian Academy of Science